The Grand Ole Opry is a weekly country music concert show in Nashville, Tennessee, which began as a radio barn dance on November 28, 1925, by George D. Hay and has since become one of the genre's most enduring and revered stages. Each show consists of multiple guest artists as well as Opry members, who are selected by Opry management based on several factors including critical and commercial success, respect for the history of country music and commitment to appearing on the program. Publicly, once a new member is chosen, an existing member will ask the new member to join the Opry live on-air during the broadcast, usually when the new member is performing as a guest. Being invited to become a member of the Grand Ole Opry is considered one of country music's crowning achievements.

Opry members have permission to perform at any Opry show they wish, with each show typically consisting of between five and seven members. Each show is split into four "segments", each hosted by a different Opry member who entertains the crowd, performs and introduces other members and guest artists. As such, the Opry has featured a large, rotating ensemble of members ranging from all-time greats and neotraditionalists to contemporary stars. As the Opry is a running series, membership requires that the performer appear regularly (at least 12 shows per year, according to rules in place for most of the 21st century, down from 26 in the 1960s) on the program to remain a member of the show, and if a performer ceases performing regularly at the Opry or runs afoul of management, they can be stripped of their membership; if the exiled performer reconciles and renews their commitment to the show, they can be reinstated. Membership expires when the performer dies; if a single member of a duo or group retires or dies, the surviving members may continue to maintain Opry membership on the group's behalf.  The Opry, in general, allows performers who retire, or are no longer physically able to perform on a regular basis to stay as members. The Grand Ole Opry House maintains a wall of fame backstage that contains a name plate for every person who has ever been a member of the Grand Ole Opry.

There are currently 70 Grand Ole Opry members, seven of whom have retired from performing but are still listed as standing members. Over the course of the program's history, 228 acts have held Opry membership since the show's inception. As of 2022, Jesse McReynolds of Jim & Jesse is the oldest living Opry member and Lauren Alaina is the youngest.

Acts with a † are deceased.

1920s

1930s

1940s

1950s

1960s

1970s

1980s

1990s

2000s

2010s

2020s

References

Grand Ole Opry